Aleksandr Vyacheslavovich Zhirov (born 24 January 1991) is a Russian professional footballer who plays as a centre-back for SV Sandhausen.

Club career
On 12 January 2017, he signed a 3.5-year contract with FC Krasnodar and was immediately loaned to FC Anzhi Makhachkala for the rest of the 2016–17 season.

He was released from his Krasnodar contract by mutual consent on 12 February 2018, signing with the second-tier FC Yenisey Krasnoyarsk the next day.

On 12 June 2018, he signed a two-year contract with the German club SV Sandhausen.

International career
In September 2020, he was called up to the Russia national team for the first time for UEFA Nations League games against Turkey and Hungary and a friendly against Sweden.

References

External links
 
 

Living people
1991 births
Sportspeople from Barnaul
Russian footballers
Association football defenders
Russian Premier League players
2. Bundesliga players
FC Dynamo Barnaul players
FC Volgar Astrakhan players
FC Anzhi Makhachkala players
FC Tom Tomsk players
FC Krasnodar players
FC Yenisey Krasnoyarsk players
SV Sandhausen players
Russian expatriate footballers
Russian expatriate sportspeople in Germany
Expatriate footballers in Germany
FC Krasnodar-2 players